is a Japanese retired bobsledder and track and field sprinter.

Track and field career
He competed internationally for Japan in the 200 metres and 4 × 100 metres relay, winning a relay bronze at the 2000 World Junior Championships in Athletics, taking a 200 m national title at the Japanese Athletics Championships, and was sixth in the relay at the 2003 World Championships in Athletics.

Personal bests

International competition

National titles
National Championships
200 m: 2002

Bobsleigh career
Miyazaki competed at the 2014 Winter Olympics for Japan. He teamed with driver Hiroshi Suzuki in the two-man event, finishing 28th, and with Suzuki, Shintaro Sato and Toshiki Kuroiwa in the four-man event, finishing 26th.

Miyazaki made his World Cup debut in December 2013. As of April 2014, his best finish is 19th, in a four-man event in 2013-14 at Lake Placid.

International competition

National titles
National Championships
Two-man: 2013
Four-man: 2013

Notes

References

External links

Hisashi Miyazaki at JOC 

1981 births
Living people
Sportspeople from Nagasaki Prefecture
Japanese male bobsledders
Japanese male sprinters
Olympic bobsledders of Japan
Bobsledders at the 2014 Winter Olympics
Asian Games silver medalists for Japan
Asian Games medalists in athletics (track and field)
Athletes (track and field) at the 2002 Asian Games
Medalists at the 2002 Asian Games
World Athletics Championships athletes for Japan
Japan Championships in Athletics winners
Tokai University alumni
21st-century Japanese people